A list of University of Surrey alumni which includes notable graduates and non-graduate former students of the University of Surrey.

Politics and government

UK politicians

Foreign politicians

Diplomats

Armed forces

Law

Science and academia

Engineering

Media

Arts

Actors

Music

Other

Literature

Economics

Business

Religion

Sport

Other

References

External links
University of Surrey

 
Surrey